The Sporting Life is an album by singer Diamanda Galás and multi-instrumentalist John Paul Jones, released on September 6, 1994 by record label Mute.

Reception 

Trouser Press described the album as "her most stimulating and broadly appealing work yet."

Track listing 

"Skótoseme" (Galás, Jones) – 6:27
"Do You Take This Man?" (Galás, Jones) – 6:09
"Dark End of the Street" (Chips Moman, Dan Penn) – 2:42
"You're Mine" (Galás) – 5:10
"Tony" (Galás) – 5:37
"Devil's Rodeo" (Galás, Jones, Pete Thomas) – 5:37
"The Sporting Life" (Galás, Jones) – 5:45
"Baby's Insane" (Galás) – 4:39
"Last Man Down" (Galás, Jones) – 4:50
"Hex" (Galás, Jones) – 8:04

Personnel

Diamanda Galás – vocals, Hammond organ, piano
John Paul Jones – bass guitar, lap steel guitar
Pete Thomas – drums, percussion
Technical
Richard Evans – engineering
Patricia Mooney - art direction, design
Catherine McGann - photography
"Diamanda Galás would like to dedicate her work on this album to Linda Greenberg, "Last Man Down" to Carl Valentino, and "Hex" to Michael Flanagan."

References

External links 
 

1994 albums
John Paul Jones (musician) albums
Diamanda Galás albums
Mute Records albums
Collaborative albums
Experimental rock albums by British artists